New Paluvayi is a small village in Rentachintala mandal, Guntur district, Andhra Pradesh, India. The village population is approximately 600.

Famous Personalities

Villages in Guntur district

 
mandalapu hanimireddy (sarpanch)2021-2026